Austin MacPhee (born 11 October 1979) is a Scottish football coach and former player who is currently working as an assistant coach of the Scotland national team and at Aston Villa as a set piece coach. MacPhee holds his Pro Licence and has a reputation for his work with set-pieces leading to his appointment with Danish Champions League side FC Midtjylland who are famed for their focus in this area.

Playing career
MacPhee was a youth team player with Forfar Athletic, but didn't progress to the first team. He moved to the United States aged 20 and spent three years playing college soccer for UNC Wilmington Seahawks. He then had one year with Romanian club Dacia Unirea Brăila and three years in Japan with FC Kariya, where he ended his playing career.

Coaching career

Cupar Hearts
In his first season as a head coach, MacPhee guided Cupar Hearts to Fife Amateur Cup victory for the first time in 112 years and to the Scottish Amateur Cup Final at Hampden Park. He resigned after one season in charge to take an assistant coach job with Cowdenbeath.

Cowdenbeath
Head Coach Danny Lennon hired MacPhee after seeing his coaching ability on the UEFA A Licence and noting his success at Cupar Hearts. During his time as part of Lennon's backroom staff the Club achieved back-to-back promotions moving from Division II to the Championship.

St Mirren
After their success at Cowdenbeath MacPhee teamed up again with Lennon at Scottish Premiership team St. Mirren. As part of Lennon's back room staff the Club achieved their highest Premiership finish in 2012 of 8th, followed by winning their first trophy in 27 years in 2013 (the Scottish League Cup) then repeating their 8th-place finish in 2014. The team included three young players who went on to play in the English Premiership John McGinn, Kenny McLean and Paul Dummett.

MacPhee helped secure the signing of Esmaël Gonçalves on loan from Rio Ave. Goncalves scored after 8 minutes of his debut, in a 3-2 victory over Celtic at Hampden Park. MacPhee was credited with the tactical plan behind the victory in post match comments by Manager Danny Lennon and team captain Steven Thompson. Goncalves went on to score 10 goals in three months, including a goal in the final victory over Hearts.

Mexico and World Cup 2014
MacPhee was recruited as part of the backroom staff of the Mexico National Team for the 2014 World Cup and was responsible for opposition analysis as Mexico recruited both him and Atletico Madrid analyst Antonio Perez for Brazil 2014. MacPhee had impressed the Mexican Technical Staff during an interview for a coaching job in the Mexican Championship in early 2014.

Northern Ireland
MacPhee resigned from his post at St Mirren in March 2014 to become an assistant coach with the Northern Ireland National Team and began working with Michael O'Neill. MacPhee joined the squad for the first time for their game in Montevideo, Uruguay in May 2014 as they prepared for their Euro 2016 qualifying campaign. In his first qualifying campaign working with O'Neill, the team made a historic start winning their first three games and going on to maintain their form with excellent performances against Finland, Romania and Hungary. Following their 3–1 home win against Greece, Northern Ireland secured qualification for the European Championships for the first time in history and as group winners. After the match Head Coach Michael O'Neill praised the efforts of MacPhee and his "obsessive attention to detail" on BBC Radio 5 Live and his excellent work with set-pieces which had delivered 11 goals in qualification.

A draw in Helsinki secured them as group winners for the first time in national history as they became the first team in history to win a group having been ranked in pot five. Following Northern Ireland defeating Slovenia 1-0 in Belfast the team created history by going 10 games undefeated, former Manchester United keeper Roy Carroll and Head Coach Michael O'Neill both praised MacPhee's innovative work with set-pieces and detailed work with the players as they prepared for Euro 2016.

Northern Ireland were drawn in a group with Germany, Poland and Ukraine and progressed to the knock-out stages after a historic 2-0 win over Ukraine in Lyon. MacPhee was the "only Scot at the Euros" after all home nations qualified bar Scotland. Northern Ireland were eliminated 1-0 in round of 16 following an own goal from a Gareth Bale cross.

MacPhee continued to work as one of O'Neill's assistant coaches for a total of 63 internationals until O'Neill left the post to manage Stoke City. It was announced that MacPhee was staying with Northern Ireland when Ian Baraclough was appointed as O'Neill's successor. After Baraclough's Northern Ireland secured Euro 2020 semi-final play-off success in Sarajevo with a penalty shoot-out victory over Bosnia Baraclough credited both MacPhee and Steve Harper approach to the shoot out when Baraclough had substituted two players in the 119th minute.

Heart of Midlothian
On 6 December 2016 MacPhee agreed to take over as new assistant coach to Ian Cathro at  Heart of Midlothian. The club announced that MacPhee would continue to work with Northern Ireland.

In MacPhee's time at the Club he developed a reputation for his work with set-pieces which he was given responsibility for by Northern Ireland coach Michael O'Neill. Three goals from set-pieces in the Scottish Cup semi-final and Hearts converting the most goals from imaginative set pieces in the league further grew his reputation in this area as pundits, coaches and players commented on his work.

MacPhee was appointed caretaker manager of Hearts in October 2019 as Hearts went through a legal dispute with Barnsley about the hiring of new Head Coach Daniel Stendel to replace Craig Levein. His second spell as caretaker manager ended when Stendel was appointed on 7 December. MacPhee officially left Hearts on 31 May 2020, at the end of his contract.

FC Midtjylland
After leaving Hearts MacPhee joined FC Midtjylland in Denmark who had qualified for the Champions League Group stages in a group with Liverpool, Atalanta and Ajax. The Irish Football Association announced that MacPhee would continue to work with Northern Ireland.

Aston Villa
After leaving FC Midtjylland in August 2021, MacPhee joined Aston Villa in the Premier League as a specialist set piece coach. Once again, the Irish FA initially said that MacPhee would continue his work with the Northern Irish national team. In November 2021, after manager Dean Smith was replaced by Steven Gerrard - it was confirmed that MacPhee's role would be unchanged. 

In November 2022, when Unai Emery took over as Aston Villa manager, MacPhee once again retained his role. Emery was reported as having being aware of MacPhee's work with the Scottish national team and was keen to make him an important part of his backroom staff.

Scotland 
Later in August 2021, MacPhee left his position with Northern Ireland to take an assistant coach position with the Scotland national team alongside his Aston Villa role.

FIFA and UEFA
MacPhee has previously held roles as a UEFA Technical Observer and a FIFA Coach Mentor with the Chinese National Team Staff.

AM Soccer Club
MacPhee founded the charity AM Soccer Club which provides football coaching to over 500 players. The organisation has had national acclaim winning the "Legacy Award" and producing up to 50 players for professional academies and the Scottish Performance Schools. The most notable graduate from the AM Soccer Club Curriculum was Louis Appéré who was invited into the AS Roma Academy prior to signing with Dundee United.

References

1979 births
Living people
AFC Dacia Unirea Brăila players
UNC Wilmington Seahawks men's soccer players
Heart of Midlothian F.C. non-playing staff
Footballers from Kirkcaldy
Scottish footballers
Scottish football managers
FC Kariya players
Scottish expatriate footballers
Scottish expatriate sportspeople in Japan
Expatriate soccer players in the United States
Expatriate footballers in Romania
Expatriate footballers in Japan
Association football midfielders
Aston Villa F.C. non-playing staff
Association football coaches
Cowdenbeath F.C. non-playing staff
St Mirren F.C. non-playing staff
Northern Ireland national football team non-playing staff
Scotland national football team non-playing staff
Scottish expatriate sportspeople in the United States
Scottish expatriate sportspeople in Romania